Phaedusa ceylanica is a species of air-breathing land snails, terrestrial pulmonate gastropod mollusks in the family Clausiliidae. This species is endemic to Sri Lanka.

References

Clausiliidae
Gastropods described in 1863
Taxa named by William Henry Benson